Adilet Davlumbayev (born 6 February 1988) is a Kazakhstani freestyle wrestler. He won one of the bronze medals in the 86 kg event at the 2018 Asian Games held in Jakarta, Indonesia.

Career 

In September 2015, he competed in the men's freestyle 86 kg event at the World Wrestling Championships without winning a medal. The following month, he represented Kazakhstan at the 2015 Military World Games in Mungyeong, South Korea where he won one of the bronze medals in the 86 kg event. In 2016, he won one of the bronze medals in the men's 86 kg event at the 2016 World University Wrestling Championships held in Çorum, Turkey.

In 2017, she won one of the bronze medals in the 86 kg event at the Asian Indoor and Martial Arts Games held in Ashgabat, Turkmenistan. In his bronze medal match he defeated Muhammad Inam of Pakistan.

In 2018, he won the silver medal in the 86 kg event at the Asian Wrestling Championships held in Bishkek, Kyrgyzstan. In the final, he lost against Mohammad Javad Ebrahimi of Iran.

In 2019, he competed in the men's freestyle 86 kg event at the World Wrestling Championships held in Nur-Sultan, Kazakhstan. He lost his first match against Deepak Punia of India and he was then eliminated in his second repechage match.

He competed in the 92kg event at the 2022 World Wrestling Championships held in Belgrade, Serbia. He won his first match and he was then eliminated in his next match by eventual bronze medalist Miriani Maisuradze of Georgia.

Achievements

References

External links 

 

Living people
1988 births
Place of birth missing (living people)
Kazakhstani male sport wrestlers
Wrestlers at the 2018 Asian Games
Medalists at the 2018 Asian Games
Asian Games medalists in wrestling
Asian Games bronze medalists for Kazakhstan
Islamic Solidarity Games medalists in wrestling
Islamic Solidarity Games competitors for Kazakhstan
Asian Wrestling Championships medalists
21st-century Kazakhstani people